Dieter Dekoninck (born 28 January 1991) is a retired Belgian swimmer, born in Antwerp. He competed for Belgium at the 2012 and 2016 Summer Olympics.  On both occasions, he was part of the Belgian 4 x 100 m and 4 x 200 m freestyle relay teams.  The years between 2012 and 2016 featured a range of injury-induced breaks.

Dekoninck began swimming at the age of 6 and made his international debut in 2009.  He retired after the 2016 Olympics.

References

1991 births
Living people
Swimmers at the 2012 Summer Olympics
Swimmers at the 2016 Summer Olympics
Olympic swimmers of Belgium
European Aquatics Championships medalists in swimming
Belgian male freestyle swimmers

Swimmers from Antwerp
20th-century Belgian people
21st-century Belgian people